Manas is an urban locality (an urban-type settlement) in Karabudakhkentsky District of the Republic of Dagestan, Russia. As of the 2010 Census, its population was 5,357.

History
It was established on June 9, 2005 by splitting it from the urban-type settlement of Manaskent (which was subsequently transformed into a rural locality).

Administrative and municipal status
Within the framework of administrative divisions, the urban-type settlement of Manas is incorporated within Karabudakhkentsky District as Manas Settlement (an administrative division of the district). As a municipal division, Manas Settlement is incorporated within Karabudakhkentsky Municipal District as Manas Urban Settlement.

References

Notes

Sources

Urban-type settlements in the Republic of Dagestan
Populated places established in 2005